The 2012 Baltic Chain Tour was the second modern era edition of the Baltic Chain Tour road cycling race. It was held over a period of four days between 21 and 25 May 2013. The race was a part of the 2012 UCI Europe Tour with a race classification of 2.2. General classification was won by Lithuanian cyclist Gediminas Bagdonas.

Schedule

Teams

Stages

Stage 1
21 August 2012 – Tallinn to Viljandi,

Stage 2
22 August 2012 – Viljandi to Otepää,

Stage 3
23 August 2012 – Smiltene to Rīga,

Stage 4
24 August 2012 – Šiauliai to Utena,

Stage 5
25 August 2012 – Utena to Vilnius,

Classification leadership table

Final standings

General classification

Sprint classification

Mountains classification

Young riders classification

Team classification

References

2012 UCI Europe Tour
2012 in Latvian sport
2012 in Estonian sport
2012 in Lithuanian sport
Baltic Chain Tour